Apartment Khunpa is a Thai indie rock band from Bangkok. Formed in 2002, its members include singer-songwriter Tul Waitoolkiat (Tul), guitarist Piyanart Jatikasathira (Pump), lead guitarist Gun Rujinarong (Ball), bassist Pukan Sansuriya (Mai) and drummer Tassarirk Limsila (Ja).

Awards 
Best Group Artist - Kom Chud Leuk
Best group – Fat Radio
Album of the year 2003 – Fat Radio
Album of the year 2005 – Fat Radio

Discography 
Bangkok Love Story - 2003
Romantic Comedy - 2006
Somros Lae Para – 2008
Bottom Up - 2015
Loveism - 2016

References 
DOODDOT. (2014, February 19). Retrieved from #Visit : พูดคุยกับ “ตุลย์ อพาร์ตเมนต์คุณป้า” ศิลปินและกวีหนุ่มในมุมที่คุณอาจจะไม่เคยรู้จักเขามาก่อน [English translation]: http://www.dooddot.com/dooddot-interview-with-tul-apartment-khun-pa/
Khunpa, A. (2012, May 9). 13 Thailand's Alternative. (M. Atlas, Interviewer) Retrieved from https://www.youtube.com/watch?v=7OF-qu6NO-E
Khunpa, A. (n.d.). Apartment Khunpa. Retrieved from Fungjai.com: https://www.fungjai.com/artists/apartment-khunpa
Khunpa, T. f. (n.d.). Student Weekly. Retrieved from Time for Apartment Khunpa: http://www.student-weekly.com/160516/160516-entertain-02.html#.WMI9Njt96Ul

Thai rock music groups